John Hillman may refer to:

 Jack Hillman (1871–1952), English footballer
 Jack Charles Hillman (1893–1977), Canadian politician
 John Eric Hillman known as Eric Hillman (born 1966), American baseball player
 John R. Hillman (born 1963), American structural engineer
 John Wesley Hillman (1832–1915), American prospector and explorer
 John Hillman (ice hockey), see List of USHL players drafted by NHL teams

See also
Jack Hillman (disambiguation)